William Thomas Brownlow Cecil, 5th Marquess of Exeter,  (27 October 1876 – 6 August 1956), known as Lord Burghley from 1895 to 1898, was a British peer.

Exeter was the son of Brownlow Cecil, 4th Marquess of Exeter, and his wife, the former Isabella Whichcote. He was educated at Eton and Magdalene College, Cambridge. In 1899 he acted temporarily as aide-de-camp to Major-General John Edward Boyes, with the 7th Brigade at Aldershot.

Family
Lord Exeter married Hon. Myra Orde-Powlett, daughter of William Orde-Powlett, 4th Baron Bolton, on 16 April 1901. 
They had four children:
 Lady Letitia Sibell Winifred Brownlow-Cecil (b. 20 November 1903- d. 21 July 1992 Dalton Holme, Yorkshire, ENG), married Henry Hotham, 7th Baron Hotham and had issue.
 David George Brownlow Cecil, 6th Marquess of Exeter (1905–1981)
 William Martin Alleyne Brownlowe Cecil, 7th Marquess of Exeter (1909–1988)
 Lady Romayne Elizabeth Algitha Brownlow-Cecil (22 March 1915– d. 27 June 2001 Stamford, Lincolnshire, ENG), married Major Hon. Peter Brassey, son of Henry Brassey, 1st Baron Brassey and had issue.

See also 
 Burghley House
 Brownlow Cecil, 4th Marquess of Exeter

References

External links 

1876 births
1956 deaths
Barons Burghley
People educated at Eton College
William Cecil, 5th Marquess of Exeter
Alumni of Magdalene College, Cambridge
Companions of the Order of St Michael and St George
Knights of the Garter
Lord-Lieutenants of Northamptonshire
Royal Artillery officers
British Army personnel of World War I
5